Carlo Rovida (born 17 September 1905, date of death unknown) was an Italian racing cyclist. He rode in the 1929 Tour de France.

References

External links
 

1905 births
Year of death missing
Italian male cyclists
Place of birth missing
Cyclists from Milan